The 2002–03 Connecticut Huskies men's basketball team represented the University of Connecticut in the 2002–03 collegiate men's basketball season. The Huskies completed the season with a 23–10 overall record. The Huskies were members of the Big East Conference where they finished with a 10–6 record and were the regular season co-champions. They made it to the Sweet Sixteen in the 2003 NCAA Division I men's basketball tournament. The Huskies played their home games at Harry A. Gampel Pavilion in Storrs, Connecticut and the Hartford Civic Center in Hartford, Connecticut, and they were led by seventeenth-year head coach Jim Calhoun.

Roster
Listed are the student athletes who were members of the 2002–2003 team.

Schedule 

|-
!colspan=12 style=""| Exhibition

|-
!colspan=12 style=""| Regular Season

|-
!colspan=12 style=""| Big East tournament

|-
!colspan=12 style=""| NCAA tournament

Schedule Source:

References 

UConn Huskies men's basketball seasons
Connecticut Huskies
Connecticut Huskies
2002 in sports in Connecticut
2003 in sports in Connecticut